Strunz can refer to:
 Claudio Strunz (born 1966), Argentine drummer
 Claus Strunz (born 1966), German journalist
 Thomas Strunz, (born 1968), German soccer player
 Strunz classification in mineralogy
 Strunz & Farah, a band